GPJ may refer to:
 George P. Johnson, an American marketing company
 Global Press Journal